Iseman is a surname. Notable people with the surname include:

 Frederick Iseman, American businessman
 Joseph S. Iseman (1916–2006), American lawyer and educator
 Matt Iseman (born 1971), American comedian, actor, and television host
 Vicki Iseman (born 1967), Washington, D.C.-based lobbyist